Julius Friedlænder (29  January 1810 – 18  September 1861)  was a Danish genre painter.

Biography
Friedlænder was born at Copenhagen, Denmark. He was the son of Marcus Friedländer and Rebecca Heymann. He entered the Academy in 1824, afterwards studying under Johan Ludwig Lund (1777–1867).

In 1842, he was awarded a travel scholarship from the Academy.  In 1843-44 he visited Paris and Italy, whence he derived additional subjects for his art. Still later he took to depicting military and naval life.

He exhibited at the Charlottenborg Spring Exhibition periodically between  1812-1861. He died in Copenhagen during 1861.

Among his pictures are:
Group of Tightrope Walkers just before a Performance. (Copenhagen Gallery. 1840-1841 ) 
 Upper Flights of the Spanish Steps in Rome  (Copenhagen Gallery. 1847)

References

Other sources

External links
Julius Friedlænder Artnet Worldwide Corporation

1810 births
1861 deaths
Artists from Copenhagen
Royal Danish Academy of Fine Arts alumni
Danish genre painters
19th-century Danish painters
Danish male painters
Danish Jews
19th-century Danish male artists